Apple Inc. has received praise and criticism for its environmental practices. Since 2018, Apple exclusively uses renewable energy for its offices, data centers, and retail stores. The company has also announced plans to make its supply chain and products carbon neutral by 2030. In addition to reducing its carbon footprint, Apple has also reduced the use of hazardous chemicals in its products, and increased the use of recycled materials in its products. Apple also introduced trade-in and recycling programs in its Stores. Criticism of Apple primarily centers around its use of raw materials in manufacturing, and the amount of e-waste created by its products.

Timeline of improvements 
In 1990, Apple officially released and implemented its environmental policy, while in 1991, a phase-out of lead in batteries began.

In 1992, Apple officially became a founding member of the U.S. EPA Energy Star program, which was developed to identify and promote energy-efficient computers and monitors. During this time, there was also a phase-out of chlorofluorocarbons (CFCs) in Apple manufacturing, which are substances that deplete the ozone layer.

In 1994, there was also a phase-out of nickel-cadmium batteries, while in 1995, PVC in packaging materials was phased out as well. The first Apple manufacturing site in Sacramento, California became ISO 14001 certified. ISO 14001:2004 set the criteria for an environmental management system, mapping out a framework that a company or an organization can use. If one chooses to use ISO 14001:2004, it can provide assurance to company management and employees as well as external stakeholders that environmental impact is being measured and improved. The benefits of using ISO 14001:2004 are reduced cost of waste management, saving in consumption of energy and materials, lower distribution costs, and improved corporate image among regulators, customers, and the public.

In 1997, the first Apple products were tested for conformity to TCO Certified standards. TCO Certified standards involve requirements that cover a variety of issues: environment, ergonomics, usability, emission of electrical and magnetic fields, and energy consumption, and electrical fire safety. For example, environmental demands restrict the use of heavy metals, chlorinated solvents, and other various things. Mainly, products that are labeled must meet these environmental demands. Two years after Apple agreed to meet TCO Certified's standards, in 1999, Apple introduced "Apple Product Environmental Specifications (APES) files", in which lead and cadmium in cables were restricted. Shortly after, in 2000, all of Apple's manufacturing sites became ISO 14001 certified worldwide. This accredited that Apple had a structured environmental management system (EMS) in order to manage the environmental impact of their operations.

In 2001, Apple computers and displays first met Energy Star requirements, in which they voluntarily phased out tetrabromobisphenol A (TBBPA) in all their plastic enclosure parts greater than 25 grams. They also began to purchase 100 percent of electricity for the Austin facility from renewable sources, called Austin's "Green Choice" Power Program. In 2002, Apple continued to build a more environmentally friendly effort. For example, Apple signed the European Union Code of Conduct on Power Supplies, which encourages manufacturers to design power supplies that minimize energy consumption in "off" mode.

In 2004, there was a phaseout of substances included in the European Restriction of Hazardous Substances (RoHS) Directive was initiated. Importantly noted, The Apple Supplier Code of Conduct was implemented in 2005, and in 2006, Apple was the first computer manufacturer to replace CRT displays with material-efficient and energy-efficient LCDs.

In June 2006, Apple temporarily stopped selling the eMac desktop computer and the AirPort wireless router in Europe, as they were non-compliant with the European Union's directive on harmful substances.

In 2007, Apple shareholders voted on a proposal to eliminate persistent and Bioaccumulative toxic chemicals, speed up the phase-out of toxic chemicals such as Polyvinyl chloride (PVC) and Brominated flame retardants (BFRs), and adopt a stronger e-waste "take-back" and recycling program. Shortly afterwards, Steve Jobs published an open letter claiming that "Apple is ahead of, or will soon be ahead of, most of its competitors in these areas".

In 2008, Apple introduced the unibody MacBook and MacBook Pro, which are made with recyclable aluminum and glass enclosures with arsenic and mercury-free displays. It is also made with PVC-free internal components. The MacBook Air was the first Mac to use Mercury free backlight technology with arsenic-free LCD display glass. Along with that, the iPhone 3G shipped with PVC-free handset, headphones, and USB cables; BFR-free printed circuit boards; and a mercury and arsenic-free display. Apple achieved a recycling rate of 41.9%.

In 2009, Apple revealed a complete life cycle analysis of greenhouse gas emissions, which set a new standard for full environmental disclosure. Apple is the only company in the industry that publishes the environmental footprint of each of its products. Other companies only report on a fraction of their emissions. All of their products became BFR-free with shipping and mercury-free LED-backlit displays with arsenic-free display glass. The Mac mini, iMac, and Mac Pro met the Energy Star 5.0 specification.

In 2010, all displays that were offered by Apple became mercury-free and used arsenic-free display glass. Apple introduced the Apple Battery charger for rechargeable batteries, which reduces battery waste by 78% and the carbon footprint by 63% over a four-year period. Also, Apple introduced the Mac mini, which was the world's most energy-efficient desktop computer, because it can operate on 10 watts of electricity (which is less power than a single energy-efficient CFL lightbulb). By this time, Apple also began to build facilities in Cork, Ireland; Austin, Texas; and Sacramento, California, and converted to using 100% renewable energy.

In 2011, Apple introduced iTunes cards that use 100% recyclable paper, and they also introduced the Mac App Store in 123 countries. Delivering digital downloads reduces the environmental impact of delivering software by eliminating the packaging and transportation. Apple also eliminates restored DVDs that were previously included in Mac product packaging.

In 2011, Greenpeace called on Apple to power its data centers with renewable energy. In early 2013, Apple announced it was now using 100% renewable energy to power their data centers, and that 75% of the company's overall power use came from renewable sources. That same year, the Chinese environmental group Institute of Public and Environmental Affairs (IPE) accused Apple's Chinese suppliers of discharging polluted waste and toxic metals into surrounding communities and threatening public health.

In 2012, Apple launched the redesigned iMac, using 68% less material and generating 67% fewer carbon emissions than earlier generations. Also, the aluminum stand on the iMac is made using 30% recycled content. Meanwhile, at their headquarters in Cupertino, energy use was cut by over 30%, and Apple provided a biogas-powered fuel cell and built rooftop solar photovoltaic systems. They introduced their redesigned AirPort Express with an enclosure containing bio-based polymers derived from industrial-grade rapeseed and post-consumer recycled PC-ABS plastic.

In June 2012, Apple withdrew its product line from the global registry for greener electronics program, Electronic Product Environmental Assessment Tool (EPEAT), reporting the line no longer qualified for EPEAT's ratings for green certification; the San Francisco Department of Environment then notified its agencies that Apple computers no longer qualified for city purchase funds. The line of products has since been added back.

Criticism by Greenpeace 

Greenpeace has criticized Apple for having products that they saw as unfriendly to the environment. In 2007, Greenpeace wrote an article explaining the hazardous materials that have been found in the iPhone, such as vinyl (PVC) plastic with phthalates, along with brominated compounds. Greenpeace also mentions in a different article from 2004 that Apple had refused to take the step of phasing out toxic chemicals in all of their products. They argued that Sony was removing toxins from their TVs, and that Samsung, Nokia, and Puma had also announced to phase out toxic chemicals in all of their products, yet Apple was not playing their part in the issue.

Because of Greenpeace's concern, they published a ranking guide in 2006 to improve policies and practices regarding the process of "going green". Greenpeace reached out to Apple's fans and consumers in attempt to gain the attention of Steve Jobs in September 2006. In order to do this, they launched a "Green my Apple" website that was designed to look like Apple's site. The caption on the site was, "I love my Mac. I just wish it came in green." They called this the "Green my Apple" campaign. Ultimately, their campaign was successful. Steve Jobs spoke of the company's desire to become greener in 2007.

Much later, in November 2012, Greenpeace created a ranking of companies in their progression toward greener products and waste management  Apple moved up to number six (out of sixteen), just behind Dell. Number one was Wipro, and number sixteen was RIM. Apple scored a six due to the company's lack of transparency on GHG emission reporting, clean energy advocacy, further information on its management of toxic chemicals, and details on post-consumer recycled plastic use. Despite that Apple lost points on Greenpeace's e-waste criteria, Apple exceeded its 70% goal of global recycling in 2010. Greenpeace argues that the company can increase its score by setting an ambitious goal for boosting its renewable energy use by 2020. Apple also did not plan to phase out antimony or beryllium in their products, but overall, score well on the product criteria. For example, the MacBook Pro has been known for easy recycling.

Apple has been making progress since 2006 regarding greener tactics and products. Presently in 2013, Apple states that they achieve to power every Apple facility with energy from renewable sources. They have already achieved this goal at facilities in Austin, Cork, Munich, and at the Infinite Loop campus in Cupertino. Currently, Apple's corporate facilities worldwide are at 75% renewable energy.

References

External links 
 , Apple's official environmental page

Apple Inc.